The 2006 Thailand Open was a tennis tournament played on indoor hard courts. It was the 4th edition of the Thailand Open, and was part of the International Series of the 2006 ATP Tour. It took place at the Impact Arena in Bangkok, Thailand, from September 25 through October 1, 2006. James Blake won in the final 6–3, 6–1 against Ivan Ljubičić.

Seeds

Draw

Finals

Top half

Bottom half

External links
Draw
Qualifying draw

References

Singles